William Hutton may refer to:

Sports
 Bill Hutton (William David Hutton, 1910–1974), Canadian professional ice hockey defenceman
 Tom Hutton (American football) (William Thomas Hutton, born 1972), former professional American football player
 Percy Hutton (William Frederick Percy Hutton, 1876–1951), Australian cricketer

Government
 William Hutton (Manitoba politician), politician and clergyman in Manitoba, Canada
 William Hutton (colonial administrator), British author and colonial administrator
 William Hutton, High Sheriff of Lincolnshire in 1832

Others
 William Hutton (historian) (1723–1815), poet and historian from Birmingham, England
 William Hutton (1797–1860) (1798–1860), geologist
 William Holden Hutton (1860–1930), Dean of Winchester in the early decade of the 19th Century
 William Rich Hutton (1826–1901), civil engineer known for his sketches and diary of life in the pueblo of Los Angeles
 Will Hutton (William Nicholas Hutton, born 1950), British writer, weekly columnist and former editor-in-chief for The Observer